Santo Tomé de Zabarcos is a municipality located in the province of Ávila, Castile and León, Spain. According to the 2018 census (INE), the municipality had a population of 65 inhabitants.

This small town is in the northwestern province of Avila, 30 km from the capital towards Salamanca. In the region called La Morana "Land of the Moors" This town is watered by the rivers Arevalillo and Zapardiel, not too much flow, summer low water under their beds become dry in summer, but its path contains groves and meadows .

References

Municipalities in the Province of Ávila